Following is  a list of notable restaurants in Cincinnati, in the U.S. state of Ohio:

 Arnold's Bar and Grill
 Blue Chip Cookies
 Camp Washington Chili
 Frisch's
 Gold Star Chili
 Graeter's
 LaRosa's Pizzeria
 The Maisonette
 Mecklenburg's Garden
 Penn Station
 Skyline Chili
 Wielert's

Cincinnati
Restaurants